Panathinaikos maintains youth and amateur departments since the 1950s, while Panathinaikos F.C. manage them since 1981. They cooperate with a network of 55 soccer schools in Greece (Panathinaikos FC Soccer Schools), while they were the first Greek club with academies abroad (Cyprus, United States, Australia, Canada, Israel).

History
Since 1928 József Künsztler, coach of the first team, tried to rejuvenate the team with players from the second (reverse) team.

During the 1950s the ex-player of the team, Antonis Migiakis, had the leading role on the creation of the first youth departments of the club. First coaches were Harry Game and Svetislav Glišović. Migiakis was appointed later also as a coach the years 1967-69, 1971-74 και 1981-85. Andreas Papaemmanouil had also significant contribution.

During the presidency of Yiorgos Vardinogiannis the Academy was re-organized. Alf Ramsey was appointed as Technical Director, while all the youth departments were housed in Paiania (training ground).

In 2005 Panathinaikos won the Copa Amsterdam, the annual youth football tournament, organized and hosted by AFC Ajax.

Since 2013, the academies are housed also in the Georgios Kalafatis Sports Center, the new athletic center of Panathinaikos FC.

Honours
 Greek Amateur Cup1: (2)
 1994, 1995
 Athens Cup1: (2)
 1993, 1994
 Greek U-19 Championship: (3)
 2005, 2012, 2022
 Greek U-17 Championship: (1)
 2009
 Greek U-15 Championship: (1)
 2018
 Copa Amsterdam:
 Winners (1): 2005
 Puskás Cup:
 Runners-up (2): 2010, 2013

1Competitions for amateur footballers, won by Panathinaikos' U-21 team (or Panathinaikos Amateurs, as it was called at that time).

Players

U-19 squad

U-17 squad

U-15 squad

Notable players

Notable players coming from the club's youth departments include:
Sotiris Alexandropoulos
Georgios Alexopoulos
Kyriakos Andreopoulos
Vasilis Angelopoulos
Kostas Antoniou
Angelos Basinas
Giannis Bouzoukis
Anastasios Chatzigiovanis
Kostas Chalkias
Diamantis Chouchoumis
Lambros Choutos
Christos Donis
Spyros Fourlanos
Nikos Giannitsanis
Giannis Goumas
Stefanos Kapino
Giorgos Karagounis
Stefanos Kotsolis
Sotirios Kyrgiakos
Anastasios Lagos
Spiros Livathinos
Charalampos Mavrias
Nikos Marinakis
Sotiris Ninis
Spyros Risvanis
Paschalis Staikos
Konstantinos Triantafyllopoulos
Alexandros Tzorvas
Georgios Vakouftsis
Markos Vellidis

Personnel

Academies staff

References

External links
Panathinaikos soccer schools

Panathinaikos F.C.
Football academies in Greece
UEFA Youth League teams